Laura Dassow Walls (born Laura Dassow in Ketchikan, Alaska) is an American professor of English literature and currently the William P. and Hazel B. White Professor of English at the University of Notre Dame.

Areas of research

Walls has researched the intersections of literature and science in the works of Ralph Waldo Emerson, Henry David Thoreau, Alexander von Humboldt and related authors. She specializes in American Transcendentalism—especially Henry David Thoreau and Ralph Waldo Emerson, transatlantic romanticism, literature and science, and environmental literature and ecocriticism.

Books authored

 
 
 
 

Books edited

Awards and degrees

Walls received the University of South Carolina’s Russell Research Award in spring 2010. She won the Merle Curti Award for best book in American intellectual history by the Organization of American Historians in April 2010. She received a Guggenheim Fellowship in May 2010. In October 2010, she won the Michelle Kendrick Memorial Book Award for the best book in literature and science by the Society for Literature, Science and the Arts. Walls received the Modern Language Association’s James Russell Lowell Prize for her book, The Passage to Cosmos: Alexander von Humboldt and the Shaping of America, on January 7, 2011, at the MLA’s annual convention. She has been awarded the 2012 Ralph Waldo Emerson Society Distinguished Achievement Award.

She studied at University of Washington earning a B.A. for English/Creative Writing in 1976 and an M.A. for English in 1978. She earned a Ph.D. from Indiana University in American Literature in 1992. Before going to University of South Carolina, she taught at Indiana University and Lafayette College.

Professor Walls joined the Notre Dame faculty in fall 2011 as the William P. and Hazel B. White Professor of English. She succeeds Gerald Bruns, who retired from Notre Dame in 2008 and inaugurated the William P. and Hazel B. White Professor of English chair.

References

External links
Laura Dassow Walls

Year of birth missing (living people)
Living people
American literary critics
Women literary critics
People from Ketchikan, Alaska
University of Washington alumni
Indiana University alumni
Indiana University faculty
Lafayette College faculty
University of South Carolina faculty
University of Notre Dame alumni
American women critics